The Sutter Avenue station is a station on the BMT Canarsie Line of the New York City Subway. Located at the intersection of Van Sinderen and Sutter Avenues at the border of Brownsville and East New York, Brooklyn, it is served by the L train at all times.

History
This station opened on July 28, 1906.

This station was renovated in 2006, which included new windscreens (beige with green frames) and canopies (red with green frames) that run along the entire length of the platforms except for a small section at the north end and installation of yellow tactile warning strips on the edges.  Artwork called The Habitat for the Yellow Bird by Takayo Noda was also installed and features stained glass windows of flowers on the windscreens. The renovation cost $12.56 million.

Station layout

This elevated station has two tracks and two side platforms. The station is a microcosm of early-20th century BRT construction. Ornate period ironwork adorns the quaint wooden crosswalk beneath the south end of the station.

Exit
The only entrance is via a ground level station house underneath the tracks on the northwest corner of Sutter and Van Sinderen Avenues. Inside is a token booth, turnstile bank, and a single canopied staircase to each platform at their extreme south ends.

The station once had a second entrance north of the open entrance. The entrance was accessed through a now-demolished pedestrian bridge over the Bay Ridge Branch right of way, which led to both eastern corners of Belmont Avenue and Van Sinderen Avenue to the east of the right of way, as well as both western corners of Belmont Avenue and Junius Street to the west of the right of way. The pedestrian bridge was demolished between 1980 and 1988, and the remnants of the entrance were repurposed into equipment rooms and emergency exits.

Structure changes north of the station 
North of this station, the Canarsie Line formerly split into two separate elevated structures, one above Van Sinderen Avenue and another a block east above Snediker Avenue via an "S" curve. This curve into was one of the sharpest in the subway at around 75 degrees. As the curve swung eastward, it passed under the last remnant of the Fulton Street Elevated. The tracks on this line curved east on their way to City Line, Brooklyn before ending at Pitkin Avenue. The two Canarsie elevated structures ran north into separate platforms at Atlantic Avenue.

After the Fulton Street Elevated was closed in 1956, the Canarsie Line continued using the tracks it always had and the rest of the structure fell into disuse. In 2002–2004, the portion above Snediker Avenue was abandoned and the northbound Canarsie Line track was re-routed to share the westernmost island platform with southbound Canarsie Line service there. Demolition of the unused elevated structure began in 2003 and was completed in 2005. Now, northbound L trains have a much gentler curve to the west, speeding service.

References

External links 

 
 Station Reporter — L Train
 The Subway Nut — Sutter Avenue Pictures
 MTA's Arts For Transit — Sutter Avenue (BMT Canarsie Line)
 Sutter Avenue entrance from Google Maps Street View
 Platforms from Google Maps Street View

BMT Canarsie Line stations
New York City Subway stations in Brooklyn
Railway stations in the United States opened in 1906
Brownsville, Brooklyn
East New York, Brooklyn
1906 establishments in New York City